Vober Hat is a Bangladeshi drama television series written by Masum Reza and directed by Salauddin Lavlu. It has 106 episodes which ran on Channel I from 2006-2007. It has a rural setting, depicting colourful lifestyles of a rural village. This drama stars Humayun Faridi, ATM Shamsuzzaman, Wahida Mollick Jolly, Chanchal Chowdhury, Salauddin Lavlu, Fazlur Rahman Babu, Mosharraf Karim, Tania, Diti and Bonna Mirza.

Plot
Vober Hat is a story situated in the village of Vobhodia and the play follows the story of two brothers, Harem Kha and Marem Kha, who have cut off all ties for 25 years over a trivial incident. These two brothers have not talked or looked at each other for 25 years and so instead they both use their own workers to talk to each other. (Nata is the worker for Marem Kha and Adidludin is the worker for Harem Kha.)

Harem Kha (the younger brother) and his wife Angoori have two daughters, Goina and Ayna. Goina and Ayna are both college students, but as the elder sister, Goina has failed her final exams one after the other for two years. To stop Goina from failing any more, Harem Kha hires his relative Fisa to tutor his two daughters, plus Khushboo who also attends their College. Fisa is widely known around the whole village for being a Champion Tutor, but, only for females. So Fisa soon enough falls in deep love with Goina, but the third student, Khushboo falls even deeper for Fisa, very secretly.

Marem Kha (the older brother) has two sons, Bhashan Kha and Ashan Kha. Marem Kha was married, but his wife had passed when his two sons were young. Bhashan Kha is the older brother out of the two siblings, and is the only person in the whole village of Vobhodia to ever go to University. 
Roomali is the younger sister of Marem Kha and Harem Kha, but she lives at Marem Kha's house. Roomali's Husband had left Roomali and ran away and never returned, but Roomali is not forgetting her husband to easily and she often goes out aimlessly looking for him.

However, the two brothers' offspring seek a family reunion and Bhashan Kha falls in love with the elder sister, Goina and Ashan Kha falls for the younger sister, Ayna. Harem Kha and Marem Kha find out that something is happening between their kids and are both determined to split them using threats, rules and even spying on each other's children.

There are another two important houses in this story, which is coachar Mama's house and Carbala Kaka's house. The greatly respected coachar Mama is the local football coach and once coached the two brothers Marem Kha and Harem Kha. coachar Mama lives with his elder Son, Toofa, his younger daughter, Khushboo and his brother-in-law Shada Miya. coachar Mama was also married but his wife died after giving birth to Khushboo. 
Tofa's is important character of this drama. He is a Music Teacher and he also only teaches females. So following Fisa, Tofa falls in love with Goyna's younger sibling Ayna. But here too there is a love triangle. Carbala Kaka's daughter Nokshi is deeply in love with Tofa.

Neighbouring coachar Mama's house is indeed Carbala Kaka's house. Carbala Kaka's house consists of his sister, Gole, his two young children, Dola and Kala and his older daughter, Nokshi, who also attends the same college as Goyna. And again, Carbala Kaka's wife died many years ago.

The story goes on slowly like this but one man interrupts the story and turns it upside down. Into the story two important new characters enter, and they are Dhobola and "Jotish" Baba Huzur. Dhobola is a sweet young girl who lives in the nearby village with her close friend Mahela. She is also a student and is studying for her final exams therefore a tutor would help her. Fiza is the only tutor, so he accepts Dhobola's plea, which ends up being a demand. As like many of the women in the village, Dhobola falls for Fiza, causing even more tension for Fiza.

The "Jotish" is known as the 'Fortune teller'. He is believed to have supernatural powers of controlling the Sun and the Moon which help him to gain the hearts of the people of Vobhodia. But the people of Vobhodia are unaware of what kind of evil Jotish Baba is planning.

Cast
 Humayun Faridi as Harem Kha
 ATM Shamsuzzaman as Marem Kha
 Wahida Mollick Jolly as Anguri, wife of Harem kha
 Diti as Roomali, sister of Harem Kha and Marem Kha
 Mosharraf Karim as Bhashan Kha
 Bonna Mirza as Goyna Parveen
 Bobby as Ayna Parveen
 Shamim Hassan as Ashan Kha
 Sazzad Reza as Ashan Kha (Role)
 Salauddin Lavlu as Tofa Shek
 Farzana Chobi as Nokshi
 Fazlur Rahman Babu as Shada Miya
 Tania Ahmed as Golejaan
 Chanchal Chowdhury as Fiza
 Rasheda Chowdhury as Muntaha
 Mita Noor as Dhobola
 Nojor Ali as Pran Rai
 Dr.Ezazul Islam as "Jotish Huleman Boksh" Baba Huzur
 Rahmat Ali as Mofa Cochar or Guruji
 Hosne Ara Putul as Khushboo
 Ahsanul Haque Minu as Karbala Lathial
 AKM Hasan as Adiludin
 Shamim Zaman as Nata
 Shamima Islam Tusti as Miss Mahela
 Manshi Shah as Miss Rahela
 Nahid as Kala
 Nurunnobi as Dhola

Shooting location
Khotib Khamar (House) Bari, Hotapara, Gazipur, Dhaka, Bangladesh.

References

2006 Bangladeshi television series debuts
2000s Bangladeshi television series
Bangladeshi drama television series
Bengali-language television programming in Bangladesh
Channel i original programming